Whole foods are foods that are unprocessed and unrefined, or processed and refined as little as possible. Depending on the context this may sometimes refer to an all natural diet or a plant based diet. This is sometimes the premise of clean eating.

Whole Foods may also refer to:

 Whole Foods Co-op, a United States food cooperative
 Whole Foods Market, a United States food supermarket chain